Bhogapuram is a village in Vizianagaram district of the Indian state of Andhra Pradesh. It is located in Bhogapuram mandal of Vizianagaram revenue division.

Geography 

Demography 

 census of India, Bhogapuram had a population of 9,341. The total population constitute, 4,645 males and 4,696 females —a sex ratio of 1011 females per 1000 males. 930 children are in the age group of 0–6 years, of which 452 are boys and 478 are girls. The average literacy rate stands at 63.98% with 5,381 literates, significantly higher than the state average of 67.41%.

Transport 

Bhogapuram is located on the National Highway 16. The government of Andhra Pradesh is planning to build a greenfield airport at Bhogapuram.

Politics 

Bhogapuram assembly constituency had 125,856 voters in the 1999 elections.
Bhogapuram legislative assembly segment has been merged into Nellimarla legislative assembly segment in 2009.

List of Members of Legislative Assembly:
1955 - Botcha Adinarayana
1962 - Kommuru Appadu Dora, Indian National Congress
1967 - Kommuru Appadu Dora, Indian National Congress
1972 - Kommuru Appadu Dora, Indian National Congress
1978 - Kommuru Appadu Dora, Indian National Congress
1983 - Pathivada Narayana Swamy Naidu, Telugu Desam Party
1985 - Pathivada Narayana Swamy Naidu, Telugu Desam Party
1989 - Pathivada Narayana Swamy Naidu, Telugu Desam Party
1994 - Pathivada Narayana Swamy Naidu, Telugu Desam Party
1999 - Pathivada Narayana Swamy Naidu, Telugu Desam Party
2004 - Pathivada Narayana Swamy Naidu, Telugu Desam Party

References 

Villages in Vizianagaram district
Mandal headquarters in Vizianagaram district